Pinson High School was a public high school in Pinson, Tennessee. Founded in 1873 by J. C. Wright, it had nearly 150 students within two years of its establishment. It was disestablished in 1956 with the formation of South Side High School from several local institutions.

The school's best-known alumnus was renowned country music singer Eddy Arnold, who played the guitar at school functions while attending Pinson. Arnold did not graduate, however—he dropped out to help his family with farm work.

References 

Defunct schools in Tennessee
Educational institutions disestablished in 1956
Educational institutions established in 1873
Public high schools in Tennessee
Schools in Madison County, Tennessee
1873 establishments in Tennessee